Malcolm Dick is an English rock drummer and classical percussionist. Dick is from County Durham, England. He currently resides in Whitley Bay, Tyne and Wear, and spends some time in Sydney, Australia at his mansion.

His drumming credits include work with Ever Ready Brass Band (now Reg Vardy Band), Toy Dolls, Martin Stephenson and the Daintees and Blackmore's Night. Dick also backs the Billy MacGregor Elvis Collection.

References

External links
Reg Vardy Band
Toy Dolls Band
Blackmore's Night

English rock drummers
Blackmore's Night members
Living people
The Crazy World of Arthur Brown members
Year of birth missing (living people)